Prof. Yoav Shechtman (born March 17, 1980) is an Israeli physicist. He currently heads the Nano-Bio-Optics lab at the Technion – Israel Institute of Technology. Yoav Shechtman is the son of Nobel Prize laureate Dan Shechtman.

Early life and education
Yoav Shechtman was born on March 17, 1980, to Tzipora and Dan Shechtman and spent his childhood growing up in Haifa.

From 1998 to 2001, Shechtman served in the Artillery Corps of the Israeli Defense Forces (IDF).

Shechtman holds a BSc in Physics and Electrical Engineering (2007) and a Phd in Physics (2013) which he acquired from the Technion. He later completed a postdoc at Stanford University (2016), developing super-resolution microscopy methods with W.E. Moerner.

Academic career
Since October 2016, Shechtman is a faculty member in the Technion-Israel Institute of Technology where he currently heads the Nano-Bio-Optics lab.

In 2018, Shechtman and his team at the Technion developed an efficient method for bio imaging in super resolution.

In 2021, Shechtman, in collaboration with Reut Orange-Kedem, developed a cheap and more efficient method for the production of more precise optical components.

Awards
 2016 Technion Career Advancement Chair
 2017 Zuckerman Faculty Scholar
 2018 Early Career Award of the International Association for Medical and Biological Engineering (IAMBE)
 2018 European Research Council starting grant
 2019 Uzi and Michal Halevy Award for Innovative Applied Engineering
 2020 IUPAB Young Investigator Medal and Prize
 2021 Krill Prize

Published works

See also
Dan Shechtman
Science and technology in Israel

References

External links

Nano-bio-optics lab – Yoav Shechtman

Living people
1980 births
Israeli physicists
Jewish physicists
Technion – Israel Institute of Technology alumni
Academic staff of Technion – Israel Institute of Technology
Stanford University alumni
People from Haifa
Israeli scientists
Jewish scientists